is a Japanese video game publisher established on March 27, 2006 by Toshio Tabeta, a former producer of Interchannel. While still with Interchannel, Tabeta's team was responsible for mainly developing and publishing versions of visual novels originally published by VisualArt's for consumer platforms like the PlayStation 2 and PlayStation Portable. After Prototype split off from Interchannel, the company still continued to work with VisualArt's. Prototype is also involved in producing mobile phone ports through VisualArt's Motto which Prototype manages. Prototype has also produced a set of drama CDs based on Key's visual novel Clannad.

Games published

Console games

Portable games

Mobile phone games

References

External links
Prototype's official website 
VisualArt's Motto's official website 

Software companies based in Tokyo
Video game companies established in 2006
Amusement companies of Japan
Video game companies of Japan
Video game publishers
Japanese companies established in 2006